Hacıhamza can refer to:

 Hacıhamza, Aşkale
 Hacıhamza, Kargı